The television industry in China includes high-tech program production, transmission and coverage. China Central Television is China's largest and most powerful national television station. By 1987, two-thirds of people in China had access to television, while today, over 3,000 channels are available in the country.

Chinese television drama has also proven to be a hot spot in today's popular culture (similar to K-dramas), with well received Chinese television dramas such as Princess Agents, Nirvana in Fire, The Journey of Flower, Eternal Love, Story of Yanxi Palace, Ashes of Love, The Princess Weiyoung, Love O2O, The Legend of Mi Yue, Scarlet Heart, and more garnering billions of views among China's most popular video websites, iQiyi, Youku, Tencent Video and Le Video. Some dramas have been so popular and widely acclaimed that they were remade into different languages, as well as spinning off with a sequel.

Chinese variety scene has also become widely successful with popular shows such as Happy Camp, Super Girl, Sing! China and more gaining worldwide recognition, garnering from millions to billions of viewership and winning numerous awards.

History

Origins 
When the People's Republic was founded in 1949, the telecommunications systems and facilities in China were outdated and rudimentary, and many had been damaged or destroyed during the Second Sino-Japanese War. Communications in China were established rapidly in the early 1950s. By 1952 the principal telecommunications network centered on Beijing, and links to all large cities had finally been established, enabling the launch of television broadcasts. The first Chinese television station in the world was Rediffusion Television (now ATV, off-air since 2016), which launched in Hong Kong on May 29, 1957. On the mainland, the first national broadcasts began on May 1, 1958, and Beijing Television (now China Central Television since 1978) was formally launched on September 2, 1958. A month later, the first regional station, Shanghai Television was launched, on the 9th National Day, which was on October 1, 1958. Liaoning Television would begin a year later, and in 1960, Zhejiang and Guandong provinces had their stations begin full broadcasts.

Growth in telecommunications halted with the general economic collapse after the Great Leap Forward (1958–60) but revived in the 1960s: radio-television services were installed in major cities in these years. By 1965 there were 12 television stations in mainland China, 1 national and 11 regional (compared to approximately 700 conventional television stations and about 3,000 cable channels today). Similarly, in 1978, there was less than one television receiver per 100 people, and fewer than ten million Chinese had access to a television set (in 2003 there were about 35 TVs for every 100 people, and roughly a billion Chinese had access to television); expansion and modernization of the broadcasting systems continued throughout the late-1970s and early 1980s.

Until the mid-to-late 1970s, TV broadcasts started in the late afternoon and ended at midnight, with special daytime programs during the summer and winter vacations for students. BTV, at the same time, also expanded its programming reach, from the one channel the station started in 1958, the network grew to 3 channels in 1969.

The first Chinese color TV broadcasts was launched by TVB in Hong Kong in 1967 and China Television in Taiwan in 1969. On the mainland, test color broadcasts started in 1971 on BTV Channel 2, and later spread towards the regional stations, and at the same time, BTV pioneered nationwide satellite broadcasts only for major events starting in 1972. BTV fully converted to color in 1973.

1980s 
The Ministry of Radio and Television was established as a separate entity in 1982 to administer and upgrade the status of television and radio broadcasting. Subordinate to this ministry were the Central People's Broadcasting Station, Radio Beijing, and China Central Television. Additionally, the various broadcasting training, talent-search, research, publishing, and manufacturing organizations were brought under the control of the Ministry of Radio and Television. In 1986 responsibility for the movie industry was transferred from the Ministry of Culture to the new Ministry of Radio, Cinema, and Television.

Radio and television expanded rapidly in the 1980s as important means of mass communication and popular entertainment. In 1982 television was by one measure available only to 350 million of China's population of 1 billion, and was mostly watched on a communal basis. By 1985 television reached two-thirds of the population through more than 104 stations (up from 52 in 1984 and 44 in 1983); an estimated 85 percent of the urban population had access to television. During this time, the content of the programming changed drastically from the political lectures and statistical lists of the previous period. Typical television shows were entertainment, including feature films, sports, drama, music, dance, and children's programming. In 1985 a survey of a typical week of television programming made by the Shanghai publication Wuxiandian Yu Dianshi (Journal of Radio and Television) revealed that more than half of the programming could be termed entertainment; education made up 24 percent of the remainder of the programming and news 15 percent. A wide cross section of international news was presented each evening. Most news broadcasts had been borrowed from foreign news organizations, and a Chinese summary was dubbed over. China Central Television also contracted with several foreign broadcasters for entertainment programs. Between 1982 and 1985, six United States television companies signed agreements to provide American programs to China.

Since the late 1950s, people in Pearl River Delta began to receive channels from Hong Kong with coaxial cable (1957-1973) and Yagi–Uda antenna (1967 onwards). Hong Kong channels were considered more entertaining and had Cantonese shows. Such reception was banned by central government, but semi-accepted by local government. By the late 1980s, local channels began to syndicate shows from Hong Kong.

China launched its first television-broadcast satellite in 1986.

In 1987 China Central Television (CCTV), the state network, managed China's television programs. In 1985 consumers purchased 15 million new sets, including approximately 4 million color sets. Production fell far short of demand. Because Chinese viewers often gathered in large groups to watch publicly owned sets, authorities estimated that two-thirds of the nation had access to television. In 1987 there were about 70 million television sets, an average of 29 sets per 100 families. CCTV had four channels that supplied programs to the over ninety television stations throughout the country. Construction began on a major new CCTV studio in Beijing in 1985. CCTV produced its own programs, a large portion of which were educational, and the Television University in Beijing produced three educational programs weekly. The English-language lesson was the most popular program and had an estimated 5 to 6 million viewers. Other programs included daily news, entertainment, teleplays, and special programs. Foreign programs included films and cartoons. Chinese viewers were particularly interested in watching international news, sports, and drama (see Culture of the People's Republic of China).

1990s 
In September 1993, after acquiring the STAR TV satellite network, Rupert Murdoch publicly declared: 

After this, the former prime minister Li Peng requested and obtained the ban of satellite dishes throughout the country. Subsequently, the STAR TV network dropped the BBC channels from its satellite offer. This, and many ensuing declarations from Murdoch, led critics to believe the businessman was striving to appease the Chinese government in order to have the ban lifted. It is also alleged that the PRC government was unhappy with BBC coverage and threatened to block STAR TV in the huge mainland Chinese market if the BBC was not withdrawn. This is despite technology that is capable of blocking BBC World in China, while making it available in other countries they serve.

On New Year's Day 1994 at 06:00 Hangzhou Time, Zhejiang Television was China's first commercial satellite television based in East China surrounding areas, Yangtze Delta.

On 6 October 1997 at 09:00 Hefei Time, Anhui Television was China's second commercial satellite television and on 28 December same year at 06:00 Nanjing Time, Jiangsu Television was China's third commercial satellite television based in East China surrounding areas, Yangtze Delta.

On 1 October 1998 at 06:00 Shanghai Time, Dragon Television (Shanghai) (formerly known as Shanghai Television) was China's fourth commercial satellite television based in East China surrounding areas, Yangtze Delta (free-to-air terrestrial television in Shanghai only).

2000s 
In 2000, the Chinese government put forward a goal of promoting media amalgamation by establishing trans-regional multi-media news groups. It also instituted detailed regulations on media industry fund raising, foreign-funded cooperation and trans-media development.

The State Administration of Radio, Film, and Television (SARFT), founded at the end of 2001, integrated the resources of central-level radio, television and film industry plus those of the radio and television, Internet companies into China's biggest and strongest multi-media group covering the fields of television, Internet, publishing, advertising, etc. At the same time Chinese media industry is cooperating with overseas media groups.

By 2003, 30 overseas television networks, including Phoenix Television, Bloomberg Television, STAR TV, Eurosport, BBC World, CNBC, and China Entertainment Television had entered into China with limitations. At the same time, the English-language channel of CCTV entered the United States through Fox News Internet under the jurisdiction of News Corporation.

In conformity with trends in the international television industry, CCTV has made progress in the direction of specialization, introducing three specialized channels between 2003 and 2004, CCTV-News, CCTV-Children and CCTV-Music.

Since September 1, 2006, the Chinese government has banned foreign-produced animation between the hours of 5:00 to 8:00 P.M. on state-run television to protect struggling Chinese animation studios that have been affected by the popularity of such cartoons.

Despite these advances, a considerable gap remains between the eastern coastal region and the Chinese hinterland, where television sets and regional broadcasters are far less common.

Today 
Altogether there are 3,000 television stations across the country. Large international TV expositions, including the Shanghai Television Festival, Beijing International Television Week, China Radio and Television Exposition and Sichuan Television Festival, are held on a regular basis.

Besides judging and conferring awards, these festivals conduct academic exchange and the import and export of TV programs. Shanghai has become the largest television program trading market in Asia.

Since China entered the World Trade Organization, the trend within China's media industry is to form inter-media and trans-regional media groups operated with multiple patterns so as to meet competition and challenges from powerful overseas media groups.

In October 2014, actors and actresses who have used drugs, visited prostitutes, or broken the law are not allowed to appear on television, movies, or other forms of broadcast (radio and advertisement) in China. The ban also encompasses online media, film and publishing. China Daily reported that the ban is meant to "keep the industry healthy" and "Celebrities who break the law should not be invited to appear in programs, and transmission of their words should be suspended." It was also noted that "Recent cases involving stars using drugs or visiting prostitutes have harmed the image of the entertainment industry and set a bad example for young people." In 2014, China has detained several Chinese celebrities on drug-related charges. China's Ministry of Public Security stated in February 2014, that police need to "get tough on drugs, gambling, and prostitution."

All nationwide analog shutdown start on 31 July 2020 at midnight stroke and last analog broadcasting station officially turn off on 1 April 2021 at midnight stroke.

Censorship 

Television censorship is conducted by State Administration of Radio, Film, and Television of People's Republic of China (PRC) and targets the overseas programs (including those from Hong Kong and Macau), that can be watched in Mainland China. In addition receiving satellite TV signals without permission is against the law in Mainland China.

CNN has reported that their broadcast agreement in China includes an arrangement that their signal must pass through a Chinese-controlled satellite. In this way, Chinese authorities have been able to black out CNN segments at will. CNN has also said that their broadcasts are not widely available in China, but rather only in certain diplomatic compounds, hotels, and apartment blocks.

Blacked out content has included references to the 1989 Tiananmen Square protests and massacre, the Dalai Lama, the death of Zhao Ziyang, the 2008 Tibetan unrest, the Chinese milk scandal of 2008, negative developments about the Beijing Olympics, and historical dramas, such as Story of Yanxi Palace during national events.。

During the Summer Olympics in Beijing all Chinese TV stations were ordered to delay live broadcasts by ten seconds, a policy that was designed to give censors time to react in case free-Tibet demonstrators or others staged political protests. During a television report of the inauguration of Barack Obama in 2009, the state-run China Central Television (CCTV) abruptly cut away from its coverage of Obama's address when he spoke of how "earlier generations faced down fascism and communism".

Enforcement in television censorship is increasingly difficult and ineffective in the early part of the twenty-first century, partly due to satellite signal hacking systems that can be purchased in most major cities for as low as 2000 ¥ RMB ($285), which access channels and programs on many satellites serving the Asian Pacific region.

In 2021 China banned BBC World News although access had already been heavily restricted before then and what was carried was censored with parts of the show being blacked out by censors live. They were banned due to their coverage of the Uyghur genocide and in retaliation for CGTN’s ban from the British market for violating broadcast regulations there.

During the 2022 COVID-19 protests in China, CCTV's coverage of the 2022 FIFA World Cup censored scenes of maskless fans in the stadium. CCTV avoided coverage of the protests directly.

Digital terrestrial television 
According to the Chinese government's plans, by 2010 the existing cable television in cities above county levels in eastern and middle parts of China as well as in most of cities over county level in western parts of the country will be digitized. The analog signals within the country will be switched off in stages between 2015 and 2018, due to large size of the territory. In the meantime, the policies emphasize the continued amalgamation of the three networks of Internet, television and telecom.

To realize the above goals, NDRC, MII and SARFT will be responsible for organizing special projects for implementing digital television services. Support will be given to digital TV related enterprises' listings and more investment will be injected into them.

According to China's national strategy, the country aims to shift from a major television manufacturer to a digital television power during the development of digital television industry. The policies show that by 2010, the annual sales of China's digital television sets and related products will reach RMB250 billion and the export volume will reach US$10 billion. By 2015, China's digital television industry scale and technology level will rank among the top in the world and it will become one of the world's largest digital television set and key components development and production bases. First analog broadcasting television station officially turn off on 30 August 2020 at 23:59:59 CST (UTC+8) for all Hunan Province on Hunan Television only and all analog broadcastings officially full-time completely turn off on New Year's Eve (31 December) 2020 at 03:59:59 CST (UTC+8) for all nationwide (including Shanghai and Suzhou) so all analog broadcastings officially full-time completely turn off on 31 March 2021 at 23:59:59 CST (UTC+8) for all Shaanxi Province. On New Year's Eve (31 December) 2020 at 04:00:00 CST (UTC+8), the digital terrestrial television of the People's Republic of China fully turned, shifted and switched to all full high definition for all nationwide (including Shanghai and Suzhou). On 1 April 2021, the digital terrestrial television of the People's Republic of China fully turned, shifted and switched to all full high definition for all Shaanxi Province.

Cable television 
Cable television is the usual transmission method in all urban areas of mainland China - television aerials are an extremely rare sight. Cable systems usually carry all the CCTV channels in Mandarin, plus all the channels of municipal, provincial or regional station in question (such stations are listed below). The remaining slots carry the main channels from several other province-level stations, and may carry additional channels from metropolitan stations such as BTV and Shanghai Media Group. They may also carry a local channel for a particular sub-provincial municipality, prefecture or county. Individual compounds (hotels, housing estates, etc.) often add a request channel showing karaoke music videos and animations. An extremely small number of compounds with many foreign residents (e.g. five star hotels in Beijing) will also carry selected channels from Hong Kong, Taiwan and the West. Phoenix Television has the widest carriage under this rule.

Mainland China had more than 44.5 million digital cable television users in 2008, had 0.9 billion digital cable television users and 0.2 billion IPTV Users in 2015.

Unlike many cable television operators in other countries that support two-way modes, China's cable television runs in a one-way mode (download only, no upload and no interactive services).

Most viewed channels
The top 10 channels based on viewing ratings:

List of national networks and channels

China Central Television

National free-to-air public satellite television

Others

Non-Standard Chinese satellite television

Children's channels

Premium satellite television
Private Owned channel's with landed rights

Other
 China Entertainment Television
 Phoenix Television

Hong Kong 

Hong Kong has two broadcast television networks, ATV and TVB. The latter, launched in 1967, was the territory's first free-to-air commercial station, and is currently the predominant TV station in the territory. Paid cable and satellite television have also been widespread. The production of Hong Kong's soap drama, comedy series and variety shows have reached mass audiences throughout the Chinese-speaking world. Broadcast media and news is provided by several companies, one of which is government-run. Television provides the major source of news and entertainment for the average family.

Macau 

Macau citizens can receive most of the terrestrial transmissions broadcast in Hong Kong.

See also 
China Central Radio and TV University
Chinese Central Television
Telecommunications in China
Media of China

References

Sources 
 Ying Zhu and Chris Berry (editors), TV China, Indiana University Press, 2009.

External links
 

 
Censorship in China